The Abercrombie River National Park is a protected national park that is located in the Central Tablelands region of New South Wales, in eastern Australia.

Features
The park includes the catchments of Silent Creek and the Retreat River, as well as a  section of the Abercrombie River. The Abercrombie River National Park protects an important area of remnant bushland within the south-western Central Tablelands. It contains a diversity of vegetation communities characteristic of montane and tableland species as well as of the western slopes of New South Wales. The park makes an important contribution to nature conservation in the Central West by providing habitat for a number of animal species with large home range requirements and low domestic densities. The park provides opportunities for vehicle touring, bushwalking, swimming, fishing, picnicking and camping amid spectacular scenery. It also provides a pleasant natural break in the landscape between vast areas of cleared grazing land and large areas of pine plantations.

See also

 Protected areas of New South Wales
 List of national parks of Australia

References

External links
 
 
 

National parks of New South Wales
Protected areas established in 1995
1995 establishments in Australia
Central Tablelands